Leon M. Negruzzi (August 17, 1899–October 6, 1987) was a Romanian poet, prose writer and translator.

Born in the Austrian city of Wiener Neustadt, his parents were Mihail L. Negruzzi, a general in the Romanian Army, and his wife Lucia (née Miclescu). His great-grandfather was Constantin Negruzzi, while Iacob Negruzzi was his great-uncle. In 1916, he graduated from the Iași Boarding High School. Following World War I, he obtained a degree from the law faculty of Iași University. He settled in France in 1925, and worked at Éditions Albin Michel. Following World War II and the onset of a communist regime in his native country, he was active in informing the Western public about he situation in Soviet-occupied Romania. In February 1952, he presented a Mémorandum des refugiés roumains adressé a l’Organisation des Nations Unies to the United Nations General Assembly; the document was signed by a number of Romanian writers, including Aron Cotruș, Mircea Eliade, Claudiu Isopescu and Eugen Lozovan. Negruzzi published travel accounts, novels and poems. His prose was Voltairesque and he observed humankind without illusions. He also translated Romanian novels into French. He died in Paris.

Notes

1899 births
1987 deaths
People from Wiener Neustadt
Romanian emigrants to France
Academic staff of Alexandru Ioan Cuza University
Romanian travel writers
Romanian translators
Romanian writers in French
Romanian anti-communists
20th-century Romanian poets
20th-century Romanian novelists
20th-century translators